Cucumerunio websteri is a species of freshwater mussel, an aquatic bivalve mollusc in the family Hyriidae.

It is one of three species of native freshwater mussels identified in New Zealand, the other two being Echyridella menziesii, and the more recently discovered Echyridella lucasi

Subspecies 
 Cucumerunio websteri websteri (Simpson, 1902)
 Cucumerunio websteri delli McMichael & Hiscock, 1958

Description 

The specific name websteri is in honor of Reverend William Henry Webster (died 1931) of Wauiku, New Zealand, who have sent specimens to the National Museum of Natural History. Cucumerunio websteri then was described under the name Diplodon websteri by American malacologist Charles Torrey Simpson in 1902.

Simpson's original text (the type description) reads as follows:

The length of the shell is 62–81 mm. The height of the shell is 32–39 mm. The width of the shell is 14–20 mm.

Distribution 
It lives in the North Island, New Zealand. The type locality is New Zealand, but the exact type locality is unknown.

Habitat 
It inhabits lakes and streams.

References 
This article incorporates public domain text from reference.

Further reading 
 Webster W. H. (1905) "Additions to the New Zealand Fauna". Transactions and Proceedings of the Royal Society of New Zealand 38: 309-312. plate XXXIV, figure 5, 5a, 5b.
 Suter H. (1913) Manual of the New Zealand Mollusca. Wellington, 1120 pp., 943-944.

External links 

 http://www.mollusca.co.nz/speciesdetail.php?speciesid=2310&species=Cucumerunio%20websteri

Hyriidae
Molluscs described in 1902